Ramona Bachmann (born 25 December 1990) is a Swiss professional footballer who plays as a forward for Division 1 Féminine club Paris Saint-Germain and the Switzerland national team.

Bachmann, who is from Malters, moved to Sweden aged 16 and played for Umeå IK for four seasons from 2007 until 2011. She spent the 2010 season playing in the United States for Women's Professional Soccer (WPS) club Atlanta Beat. Ahead of the 2012 season she left Umeå and signed a contract with LdB FC Malmö. She went to German Allianz Frauen-Bundesliga club VfL Wolfsburg in the summer of 2015.

Since making her debut for the Switzerland women's national football team in June 2007, Bachmann has won over 50 caps. She made her reputation with Switzerland's youth national teams, playing at the 2006 and 2010 editions of the FIFA U-20 Women's World Cup and being named UEFA's Golden Player at the 2009 UEFA Women's Under-19 Championship. At senior level Bachmann helped Switzerland qualify for the FIFA Women's World Cup for the first time in 2015. A persistent back injury hampered Bachmann's progress during the early part of her career.

Club career
Starting her career in FC Malters before moving to SC Luwin, she then rejected offers from both Germany and USA to sign for Swedish club Umeå IK in Damallsvenskan at the age of 16 in 2007. Following Marta's departure from the club in 2009, Bachmann became a key player at Umeå. She was voted Swiss female Player of the Year in 2009.

In 2010, Bachmann joined new Women's Professional Soccer expansion team Atlanta Beat as their No. 1 pick in the 2009 WPS International Draft. After an injury-hit season in the professional WPS, and after her contract with the Atlanta Beat was not renewed, Bachmann rejected offers from Germany, England and the United States to return to Umeå for the 2011 season.

She was named the best player of the 2011 season, and subsequently moved to defending champion LdB Malmö. Playing alongside Marta, Mittag and others, she slowly turned into one of the best footballers in the world. She won the Damallsvenskan in her last season with LdB Malmö.

On 26 August 2015 it was announced that Bachmann had joined German side VfL Wolfsburg for a contract that will last until 2018. She was chosen Swiss Player of the Year for a second time in 2015. In December 2016, London-based FA WSL club Chelsea announced that Bachmann had agreed to join them when the transfer window opened the following month.

In 2018, on 5 May, Bachmann scored twice, including the winning goal, in the Women's FA Cup final against Arsenal, a game which ended 3–1 to Bachmann's team, Chelsea. She was named the Player of the Match by commentator Sue Smith.

On 3 July 2020, French club Paris Saint-Germain announced the signing of Bachmann on a two-year deal.

International career

Bachmann played for Switzerland in the 2006 and 2010 editions of the FIFA U-20 Women's World Cup. During the latter tournament she was hampered by a back injury. At the 2009 UEFA Women's Under-19 Championship in Belarus, Bachmann won the UEFA.com Golden Player award.

Bachmann made her debut for the Swiss senior team against Sweden in June 2007, while only being 16 years of age . In September 2010 Bachmann scored in Switzerland's 2011 FIFA Women's World Cup qualifying defeat against England, but was criticised for her play acting that led to the dismissal of England goalkeeper Rachel Brown. Bachmann admitted there was no foul and apologised for her actions, while Brown's red card was rescinded on appeal.

Bachmann was ruled out of the following play-offs against Denmark due to her persistent back pain.

Bachmann's biggest achievement so far was the qualification for the 2015 FIFA Women's World Cup, in Canada. Switzerland had never before qualified for a World Cup. After winning their home game against Malta, the team was sitting in front of the TV watching the game between Denmark and Iceland. If it ended in a draw, the Swiss would secure the group's victory. As said by herself: "When it ended in a draw and it was certain we had won the group, we started dancing on the tables."

During the World cup, Switzerland reached the round of 16, with Bachmann scoring three times, all in a 10–1 victory over hapless Ecuador. The Swiss were edged out by hosts Canada, due to one goal by Josée Bélanger, just after the half-time break. After the World Cup, there were multiple clubs interested in the 24-year-old Bachmann, and she chose VfL Wolfsburg.

International goals

Personal life
Bachmann came out as lesbian during the 2015 FIFA Women's World Cup in Canada. She was previously in a relationship with fellow Swiss national team footballer Alisha Lehmann, who moved to London to play for West Ham United. Their national team coach Martina Voss-Tecklenburg explained: "The situation is not exceptional in women's football".

Honours
Umeå IK
 Damallsvenskan: 2007, 2008
 Svenska Cupen: 2007
 Svenska Supercupen: 2007, 2008

FC Rosengård
 Damallsvenskan: 2013, 2014, 2015
 Svenska Supercupen: 2012, 2015

VfL Wolfsburg	
 DFB-Pokal: 2015–16

Chelsea
 FA Women's Super League: 2017–18, 2019–20
 FA WSL Spring Series: 2017
 Women's FA Cup: 2017–18  
 FA Women's League Cup: 2019–20

Paris Saint-Germain
 Division 1 Féminine: 2020–21
 Coupe de France féminine: 2021–22

References

External links

Profile at Swiss Football Association 

1990 births
Living people
Women's association football forwards
Swiss women's footballers
Switzerland women's international footballers
Umeå IK players
Atlanta Beat (WPS) players
FC Rosengård players
VfL Wolfsburg (women) players
Chelsea F.C. Women players
Paris Saint-Germain Féminine players
Damallsvenskan players
Women's Super League players
Division 1 Féminine players
Expatriate women's footballers in Sweden
Expatriate women's soccer players in the United States
Expatriate women's footballers in Germany
Expatriate women's footballers in England
Expatriate women's footballers in France
Swiss expatriate sportspeople in Sweden
Swiss expatriate sportspeople in Germany
Swiss expatriate sportspeople in England
Lesbian sportswomen
LGBT association football players
Swiss LGBT sportspeople
2015 FIFA Women's World Cup players
FIFA Century Club
FC Luzern Frauen players
Women's Professional Soccer players
Sportspeople from the canton of Lucerne
UEFA Women's Euro 2022 players
UEFA Women's Euro 2017 players
Swiss expatriate women's footballers
Swiss expatriate sportspeople in France
Swiss expatriate sportspeople in the United States